Presidential elections were held in Zaire on 3 December 1977. They were the first held after a new constitution was promulgated in 1974. 

At the time, the country was a one-party state with the Popular Movement of the Revolution as the only legal party. Its leader, incumbent president Mobutu Sese Seko, was the only candidate, with voters asked to vote "yes" or "no" to his candidacy. The results showed 98.2% of voters casting a "yes" vote.

Results

References

Single-candidate elections
Presidential elections in the Democratic Republic of the Congo
1977 in Zaire
One-party elections
Zaire
Election and referendum articles with incomplete results